The Church of St. John Nepomucene is a Roman Catholic parish located on East 66th Street and 1st Avenue in Manhattan, New York City. The founders of the church were recent immigrants from Slovakia, who began meeting in St. Brigid's Parish at  8th Street and Avenue B in about 1891 and established the Society of St. Matthew to organize their own parish.

The parish was established in 1895 from within St. Elizabeth of Hungary parish, which was centered on its church on 83rd Street. The church, school and rectory were built for $300,000.

See also
 St. John Nepomucene

References

External links
 

Religious organizations established in 1895
Roman Catholic churches in Manhattan
Romanesque Revival church buildings in New York City
Slovak-American culture in New York (state)
Upper East Side
1895 establishments in New York City